The 2011 Spanish Grand Prix, formally the Formula 1 Gran Premio de España Santander 2011, was a Formula One motor race that was held on 22 May 2011 at the Circuit de Catalunya in Montmeló, Spain. It was the fifth round of the 2011 Formula One season. The 66-lap race was won by the championship leader, Red Bull Racing's Sebastian Vettel after starting from second on the grid. McLaren's Lewis Hamilton finished in second place, and his teammate Jenson Button completed the podium in third position.

As a consequence of the race, Vettel extended his lead in the World Drivers' Championship to 41 points over Hamilton. Mark Webber, who started the race from pole position, finished fourth in the race but he maintained third place in the championship, 10 points behind second-place Hamilton, and six ahead of Button. In the World Constructors' Championship, Red Bull extended their championship lead to 47 points over McLaren, with Ferrari a further 63 points behind in third position, after only Fernando Alonso reached the finish for the team, in fifth position. Sergio Pérez finished 9th and became the first driver from Mexico to score a point since Héctor Rebaque in the 1981 Dutch Grand Prix.

Report

Background
Heading into the race, Sebastian Vettel led the Drivers' Championship with 93 points, 35 more than Lewis Hamilton on 58 points, who had 3 more than Mark Webber on 55 points. Other championship rivals throughout the season, Jenson Button and Fernando Alonso were fourth and fifth on 46 and 41 respectively.

Tyre supplier Pirelli brought its silver-banded hard compound tyre as the harder "prime" tyre and the yellow-banded soft compound as the softer "option" compound. This was the same tyre selection that Bridgestone had chosen to bring to the Spanish Grand Prix for the past two years.

In the Constructors' Championship, Red Bull Racing held an advantage of 43 points over McLaren, with 148 points to McLaren's 105. Ferrari were a further 40 points behind McLaren on 65 points, and were building a gap from Renault – on 42 points - who were now having to fend off Mercedes GP who were on 26 points.

Ferrari introduced a new rear wing for the race, which came under scrutiny from the stewards and was subsequently banned.

Practice and qualifying
The first practice session saw upgrades by every single team, and took place in sunny conditions. Mark Webber led at the end of the first practice, 1.007 seconds ahead of his teammate Sebastian Vettel, with Nico Rosberg in third place in the Mercedes.

In the second practice session, Webber topped the timesheets again, this time with Lewis Hamilton coming second splitting the Red Bulls with Vettel in third.

In the third practice session, Vettel topped the timesheets despite electrical problems that limited his running. Nick Heidfeld's car suffered a fire, causing extensive damage to his car that could not be fixed in time for the qualifying session.

In qualifying, Mark Webber took his first pole of the season, with his teammate Vettel, who had been unable to use his KERS during the session, behind him in second. In third and fifth places were the McLarens of Hamilton and Button, split by the Ferrari of Fernando Alonso. Further down the grid Team Lotus celebrated their first ever entry to the second qualifying session on a dry track, with Heikki Kovalainen qualifying 15th, ahead of both Force Indias.

Heidfeld was unable to set a qualifying time, however, he was allowed to participate in the race due to having set competitive times in practice prior to the accident. This was a similar situation to the previous race in Turkey where Kamui Kobayashi had not posted a qualifying time, but had been allowed entry due to his consistent lap times within the 107% time during practice.

Race
Fernando Alonso made a perfect start to the race, overtaking both Red Bulls and Hamilton into the first corner to the cheers of the Spanish fans, and leading the race until lap 18. However, Alonso faded after the first round of pitstops where Sebastian Vettel took the lead, a position which he held to the end of the race in spite of the efforts of Lewis Hamilton, who fought him all the way to the close, finishing only 0.6 seconds behind the winner, with his teammate Button over half a minute behind in third. Button had used a three-stop strategy instead of a four-stop strategy, like most other drivers, to get ahead of Webber and Alonso. On lap 31, Liuzzi's car stopped near the Pirelli tunnel due to a gearbox failure, forcing his retirement.

Mark Webber came in fourth, after spending much of the race behind Fernando Alonso, only overtaking him on the 39th lap when the Spaniard pitted. Kovalainen crashed on lap 51, damaging the left side and wheels of his car. On Lap 57, Massa, struggling with his gearbox, beached his car in the Turns 6 and 7 chicane while running tenth, his game was over. Despite starting in the pits, behind all the other cars, Nick Heidfeld had a successful race, bringing his car home in the points with an eighth-place finish. After saving a set of tyres by not setting a Q3 time, Michael Schumacher finished sixth ahead of teammate Rosberg. The race was notable for Ferrari's lack of pace on the prime tyre with Alonso slipping from first to fifth in the pit stops alone.

Classification

Qualifying

Notes:
 – Michael Schumacher experienced a problem with his KERS device in the final period of qualifying that led to him aborting his single timed lap in Q3.
 – Nick Heidfeld's Renault R31 caught fire in the final practice session on Saturday morning, seriously damaging the exhaust system and floor of the car. Renault mechanics were unable to get the car repaired in time for the first qualifying session, meaning Heidfeld was unable to set a lap time. As he had demonstrated competitive lap times during free practice sessions, he was permitted to start the race, which he did from the back of the grid.

Race

Championship standings after the race 

Drivers' Championship standings

Constructors' Championship standings

 Note: Only the top five positions are included for both sets of standings.

See also 
 2011 Catalunya GP2 Series round
 2011 Catalunya GP3 Series round

References

External links

Spanish Grand Prix
Spanish Grand Prix
Grand Prix
May 2011 sports events in Europe